Edward James Mortimer Collins (29 June 1827 – 28 July 1876) was an English novelist, journalist and poet. Some of his lyrics, with their "light grace, their sparkling wit and their airy philosophy", were described in the 1911 Encyclopædia Britannica as "equal to anything of their kind in modern English".

Biography
He was born at Plymouth, where his father, Francis Collins, was a solicitor. He was educated at a private school, and after some years spent as mathematics master at Elizabeth College, Guernsey, he relocated to London. Collins devoted himself to journalism written from the Conservative Party perspective, mainly for periodicals. He also wrote occasional and humorous verse, and several novels. Soon after his second marriage, to Frances Collins in 1868, he settled at Knowl Hill, Berkshire and from this time he rarely left his home for a day and published several novels.

Writings
In 1855, he published his Idyls and Rhymes; and in 1865 his first story, Who is the Heir? was published. A second volume of lyrics, The Inn of Strange Meetings, was issued in 1871; and in 1872 he produced his longest and best sustained poem, The British Birds, a communication from the Ghost of Aristophanes.

He also wrote several novels, including Sweet Anne Page (1868), Two Plunges for a Pearl (1872), Miranda (1873), Mr. Carrington (1873, under the name of R. T. Cotton), Squire Silchester's Whim (1873, set in Devon), Sweet and Twenty (1875), and A Fight with Fortune (1876). His three-volume novel Transmigration (1873) is "a fantasy of multiple incarnations of which the middle one is set on a utopian Mars."

Collins is credited by the New English Dictionary with introducing the word "psithurism" to the English language. Derived from the Ancient Greek for "whisper," it was applied specifically to the whispering of the wind. This was observed (inaccurately) by The Guardian newspaper in an editorial of 30 September 1909 - reprinted on 30 September 2006 but not available online.

Notes

References

External links

Archival material at 

1827 births
1876 deaths
Writers from Plymouth, Devon
English male poets
English male novelists
19th-century English poets
19th-century English novelists
19th-century English male writers
Occasional poets